Biltine is one of three departments in Wadi Fira, a region of Chad. Its capital is Biltine.

Sub-prefectures 
Biltine is divided into four sub-prefectures:

 Biltine
Am Zoer
Arada
Mata

See also 

 Regions of Chad

References 

Departments of Chad
Wadi Fira Region